Grevillea thelemanniana, the spider-net grevillea or hummingbird bush, is a small, spreading shrub endemic to Western Australia.

The species occurs in the Perth region in low-lying areas on sandy and sandy-clay soils which are generally wet in the winter.

Description

The clusters of pink or bright red and yellow tipped flowers appear between late autumn and late spring, and can also appear in any season in garden cultivation.

Former subspecies
A number of former subspecies of Grevillea thelemanniana are now regarded as species in their own right. They include:
subsp. delta  McGill.  is now Grevillea delta  (McGill.) Olde & Marriott  
subsp. fililoba   McGill.  is now Grevillea fililoba  (McGill.) Olde & Marriott    
subsp. hirtella   (Benth.) McGill.  is now Grevillea hirtella  (Benth.)  Olde & Marriott 
subsp. obtusifolia   (Meisn.) McGill.  is now Grevillea obtusifolia  Meisn. 
subsp. pinaster   (Meisn.) McGill. is now Grevillea pinaster  Meisn. 
subsp. preissii   (Meisn.) McGill.  is now Grevillea preissii  Meisn. 
'form e' (prostrate or grey-leaf form) is now Grevillea humifusa   Olde & Marriott

Cultivation
Grevillea thelemanniana is cultivated as an ornamental plant, for use as a flowering open shrub in gardens and drought tolerant landscaping.

References

FloraBase The West Australian Flora: Grevillea thelemanniana
FloraBase The West Australian Flora: Grevillea thelemanniana (taxonomy)

External links

thelemanniana
Endemic flora of Western Australia
Eudicots of Western Australia
Proteales of Australia
Garden plants of Australia
Taxa named by Stephan Endlicher